Gulph Mills station is a SEPTA rapid transit station in Gulph Mills, Pennsylvania. This parking lot is only accessible for northbound drivers along South Gulph Road, though. All trains stop at Gulph Mills. Transfers are available for buses to the King of Prussia mall. There is off-street parking available at this station.

Station layout

SEPTA Suburban Bus connections
SEPTA Route 95: to Plymouth Meeting Mall and Willow Grove Park Mall.
SEPTA Route 124: Center City to King of Prussia mall or Chesterbrook
SEPTA Route 125: Center City to King of Prussia mall or Valley Forge.

External links

 Station from Google Maps Street View

SEPTA Norristown High Speed Line stations